Teizo Matsumura (松村 禎三 Matsumura Teizō; 15 January 1929 – 6 August 2007) was a Japanese composer and poet. Orphaned and suffering from tuberculosis, during his recovery in the early 1950s he began to write both haiku and music. He studied with Tomojiro Ikenouchi and Akira Ifukube. He was influenced by Ravel and Stravinsky, but also Asian traditions. He was Professor Emeritus of the Tokyo National University of Fine Arts and Music.

Matsumura is best known for his opera Chinmoku (in English Silence) based on the novel of the same name by Shusaku Endo. This has been recorded.

Matsumura is the recipient of the 1974 UNESCO International Rostrum of Composers and of the 1978 Suntory Music Award.

Major works
Achime for soprano, percussion and 11 players (1957)
Cryptogame for instrumental ensemble (1958)
Musique pour quatuor à cordes et pianoforte (1962)
 Symphony No. 1 (1965)
Prélude pour orchestre (1968)
Aprasas for female chorus with 2 harps, piano, harpsichord, celesta and string orchestra (1969)
Totem Ritual for mixed chorus with 8 percussions, piano, harpsichord and orchestra (1969)
Deux berceuses à la Grèce for piano (1969)
Poème I for shakuhachi and koto (1969)
Courtyard of Apsaras for flute, violin and piano (1971)
Poème II for shakuhachi solo (1972)
Two Poems by the Prince of Karu for soprano and piano (1973)
 Piano Concerto No. 1 (1973)
 Piano Concerto No. 2 (1978)
Hymn to Aurora for mixed chorus with cello, harp, percussion, piano, organ and oboe d'amore (1978)
 Fantasy for thirteen-string koto solo (1980)
 Cello Concerto (Concerto per violoncello ed orchestra) (1984)
Air of Prayer for seventeen-string koto solo (1984)
Air of Prayer for cello solo (1985)
Pneuma for strings (1986)
Trio pour violon, violoncelle et piano (1986)
Homage to Akira Ifukube for orchestra (1988)
Silence, opera (1993)
 Nocturne for harp solo (1994)
Quatuor à cordes (1996)
Poor Faithful for voice and piano (1996)
 Symphony No. 2 (1998)
Pilgrimage I - III for piano (1999-2000)
To the Night of Gethsemane for orchestra (2002)

Film score
100 Gamblers (1969)
Apart from Life (1970)
Sea and Poison (1985)
 Sen no Rikyu (The Dead of a Tea Master) (1989)
Pickpocket (2000)
Darkness in the Light (2001)
A Boy's Summer in 1945 (2002)
The Face of Jizo (2004)

External links
Biography
Interview with Matsumura Teizo - Documentary Box (Interviewer: Kitakoji Takashi)

1935 births
2007 deaths
20th-century classical composers
20th-century Japanese composers
20th-century Japanese male musicians
20th-century Japanese poets
21st-century classical composers
21st-century Japanese composers
21st-century Japanese poets
21st-century Japanese male musicians
Japanese classical composers
Japanese film score composers
Japanese male classical composers
Japanese male film score composers
Japanese opera composers
Male opera composers
Musicians from Kyoto